Colonae or Kolonai was a deme in ancient Attica of the phyle of Leontis, sending two delegates to the Athenian Boule..

Its site is tentatively located near modern Michaleza.

References

Populated places in ancient Attica
Former populated places in Greece
Demoi